Francis Preston Blair Jr. is a marble sculpture depicting the American jurist, politician, and soldier of the same name by Alexander Doyle, installed in the United States Capitol's Hall of Columns, in Washington, D.C., as part of the National Statuary Hall Collection. The statue was gifted by the U.S. state of Missouri in 1899.

See also
 1899 in art

References

External links

 

1899 establishments in Washington, D.C.
1899 sculptures
Marble sculptures in Washington, D.C.
Monuments and memorials in Washington, D.C.
Blair
Sculptures of men in Washington, D.C.